Bulawayo Chiefs F.C. is a football club from Bulawayo, Zimbabwe, currently playing in the top flight Zimbabwe Premier Soccer League.

Bulawayo Chiefs is a professional soccer team based in Luveve, in Bulawayo, Zimbabwe.

Since its founding in 2012 the club has won promotion to the PSL twice, in 2013 and 2017. In 2013 it also won the Machache Meats ZIFA Southern Region Cup. In 2016 they were runners up in the John Landa Nkomo Liquor Hub Super 8 Cup.
In addition to the championship the club also worn the John Landa Nkomo Liquor hub Super 8 cup and the Joshua Mqabuko Nkomo top 8 Knockout.
In 2017, the club won the ZIFA southern region division one championship thus gaining promotion to the 2018 Premier Soccer League.
They are called“Amakhosi Amahle”, for their dominance is nothing less than respect worthy. 

PREMIER Soccer League Twitter kings Bulawayo Chiefs have become the first football team in Zimbabwe to launch an online shop selling their club merchandise.
Chiefs, who command a huge social media following due to their lively engagements that other teams have struggled to match. The store was launched on the 23rd of June 2020..

The club is bankrolled by miner Lovemore Sibanda.

Bulawayo Chiefs have been recognized for their social media presence, which gained over 5,000 followers in its first six months including Italian club AS Roma. As of 2nd February 2021 the number of Twitter followers stands at over 41,900. 

2020 Bulawayo Chiefs Squad:

Goalkeepers: David Bizibani, Alfred Chiname, Matripple Muleya.

Defenders: Malven Mkolo, Danny Millias, Gift Gumbo, Isaac Badu, Ben Nyahunzwi, Arthur Ndlovu, Felix Moyo, Pelius Sibanda, Malvin Hativagoni.

Midfielders: Arthur Musiyiwa, Desire Shumbanhete, Corey Eli Black, Shadreck Nyahwa, Joe Nyabinde, Samuel Adom, Lucky Ndlela, Hagiazo Desire Magaya, Keith Madera, Mthokozisi Msebe, Cedric Chinomona, Micheal Ndlovu, Edward Mareya, Leon Moyo.

Strikers: Farawu Matara, Billy Veremu, Mbonisi Ncube, Kundishora Chakanyuka, Hughe Chikosa, Charles Sibanda.

References

Football clubs in Zimbabwe
Association football clubs established in 2012
2012 establishments in Zimbabwe
Sport in Bulawayo